The 2022 Men's European Water Polo Championship was the 35th running of the tournament. It was held in the Spaladium Arena in Split, Croatia from 29 August to 10 September 2022.

Croatia won their second title by defeating Hungary in the final, meanwhile Spain beat Italy to secure the bronze medal.

Venues
LEN announced on 28 August 2020 that Split, Croatia would host the 2022 edition of the competition. All games will be played at the Spaladium Arena.

Qualification

Sixteen teams were able to compete at the main event. They are broken up as follows:

 The host nation
 The top seven teams from the 2020 European Championship not already qualified as host nation
 Final eight from the qualifiers.

Russia was excluded due to the 2022 Russian invasion of Ukraine.

Format
The sixteen teams were split in four groups with four teams each. From there on, a knockout system was used. The first classified team of each group directly qualified for the quarterfinals, the second and third teams played each other in cross group format to qualify for the quarterfinals.

Draw
The draw was held in Budapest on 23 April 2022.

Squads

Preliminary round
All times are local (UTC+2).

Group A

Group B

Group C

Group D

Placement games

13–16th place bracket

13–16th place semifinals

15th place game

13th place game

Knockout stage

Bracket

Playoffs

9–12th place bracket

9–12th place semifinals

Eleventh place game

Ninth place game

Quarterfinals

5–8th place bracket

5–8th place semifinals

Seventh place game

Fifth place game

Semifinals

Third place game

Final

Final standings

Awards and statistics

Top goalscorers

Awards
The awards were announced on 9 September 2022.

References

External links
Official website

Men
Men's European Water Polo Championship
International water polo competitions hosted by Croatia
Men's European Water Polo Championship
European Water Polo Championship
European Water Polo Championship
European Water Polo Championship